Noelly Mankatu Bibiche (born 25 November 1980) is a Congolese middle-distance runner. She competed in the women's 800 metres at the 2004 Summer Olympics.

References

1980 births
Living people
Athletes (track and field) at the 2004 Summer Olympics
Democratic Republic of the Congo female middle-distance runners
Olympic athletes of the Democratic Republic of the Congo
Place of birth missing (living people)